Mad Play (foaled 1921 in Kentucky) was an American-bred Thoroughbred racehorse.  Bred by August Belmont, Jr., he was sired by Fair Play, who also sired Man o' War, out of a Rock Sand mare, Mad Cap.  He was a full brother to 1921 U.S. Champion Older Male Horse Mad Hatter.

Race career
Mad Play was trained by Sam Hildreth and he was ridden by Earl Sande. As a three-year-old, Mad Play came in third in the Preakness Stakes and second in the Dwyer Stakes, but is best known for winning the Belmont Stakes as the favorite to win by 1½ lengths, making it a third win for his owner, Harry Sinclair, of Rancocas Stable.  He then won the Brookdale Handicap, the Continental Handicap, and the Yorktown Handicap.

He placed third in the International Special No. 3 that year at Latonia Race Track in Convington, Kentucky, losing to Sarazen.

At four, he won the Long Beach Handicap, Brooklyn Handicap, the Queens County Handicap, the Empire City Handicap, the Chicago Special and the Saratoga Cup Hanicap to be the leading handicapper with a 13-7-3-3 record.

Retirement

Upon retirement Mad Play, was found to be completely sterile. He was put back into training in 1928 and raced until 1933.

Resources
 Pedigree & Part Stats
 TB Heritage Fairplay - Mad Play
 Time Mad Play's Belmont

References

1921 racehorse births
Racehorses trained in the United States
Racehorses bred in Kentucky
Belmont Stakes winners
Belmont family
Thoroughbred family 4-r
Godolphin Arabian sire line